Solomon Kane is a fictional character created by the pulp-era writer Robert E. Howard. A late-16th-to-early-17th century Puritan, Solomon Kane is a somber-looking man who wanders the world with no apparent goal other than to vanquish evil in all its forms. His adventures, published mostly in the pulp magazine Weird Tales, often take him from Europe to the jungles of Africa and back.

When Weird Tales published the story "Red Nails", featuring Conan the Barbarian, the editors introduced it as a tale of "a barbarian adventurer named Conan, remarkable for his sheer force of valor and brute strength. Its author, Robert E. Howard, is already a favorite with the readers of this magazine for his stories of Solomon Kane, the dour English Puritan and redresser of wrongs".

Solomon Kane was adapted into a film in 2009 starring James Purefoy, and has been adapted into a series of comics published by Marvel since the 1970s.

Personality and character 
In his story "Moon of Skulls", Robert E. Howard described Kane as "He was a man born out of his time — a strange blending of Puritan and Cavalier, with a touch of the ancient philosopher, and more than a touch of the pagan, though the last assertion would have shocked him unspeakably. An atavist of the days of blind chivalry he was, a knight errant in the somber clothes of the fanatic. A hunger in his soul drove him on and on, an urge to right all wrongs, protect all weaker things, avenge all crimes against right and justice."

Solomon Kane is a tall, sombre, and gloomy man with pale skin, gaunt face and cold eyes. Kane is a devout Puritan, with an unshakable faith, who lives on an endless odyssey to destroy evil and darkness in the name of God Almighty. His morality is extremely black and white, allowing for no grey areas of uncertainty. To Kane, the wicked are wicked, and the righteous are righteous, with little to nothing in between. He also seems to have little regard for his own life and safety, giving away years of his life to pursue and track down evil doers who deserved punishment. Like Howard's other character, Conan the Barbarian, Kane shows a keen sense of chivalry and propriety, defending the innocent and the weak from their wicked oppressors.

Appearance and equipment 
Kane wears the costume of a Puritan Englishman of the 16th century, being dressed entirely in black and wearing a slouch hat. He is often depicted with the stereotypical garb of his time and culture, including black leather gloves, riding boots, a doublet, and cloak. His weaponry was varied, and he carried and was proficient with a Spanish rapier, a dirk, a brace of flintlock pistols, and on one occasion, a musket.

The Staff of Solomon 
During one of his later adventures his friend N'Longa, an African shaman, gave him a juju staff that served as a protection against evil but could easily be wielded as a weapon. It is revealed in another story, "The Footfalls Within", that this is the mythical Staff of Solomon. It is an artifact belonging to the Biblical monarch of Ancient Israel, Solomon. This was a talisman older than the Earth and unimaginably powerful, much more so than even N'Longa knew. 

It is described as sharp-pointed on one end and with the head of a cat on the other, made of a wood that no longer exists on Earth. The staff is covered with ancient hieroglyphs which, along with the cat's head, were added a very long time after the staff was created. Using the staff Kane can communicate over distances with N'Longa, and it has also been used to slay vampires and evil spirits.  Having carried it for an extended period seems to have endowed Kane with the ability to sense the presence of otherworldly beings.

When Kane is taken prisoner by slavers, one of their party, "Yussef the Hadji", recognizes the staff for what it is. He says the staff is older than the world itself and holds mighty magic. The cat-head is a representation of Bast, and the priests of Bast used the staff in ancient Egypt. The feline head which now decorates the staff's top was itself carved out of a pre-existing decoration, though it is now impossible to say what manner of eldritch symbol (or creature) was originally effigiated on it. With the staff Moses (known as Musa in Arabic) did wonders before the Pharaoh and carried it with him when his people fled Egypt. For centuries it was the Scepter of Israel (mentioned in Numbers 24:17), and King Solomon used it to combat magicians and capture djinns. The staff may be related to Aaron's rod, or Moses' rod, or the Rod of Asclepius. Before this, when the world was young, Atlantean, pre-Adamite priests in silent cities beneath the seas used the staff to fight evil, millions of years before mankind was born.

Characters

N'Longa
He is an ancient African shaman, who is driven to study magic. He has travelled the world in ancient times as a slave, secretly studying under various sorcerers and holy men of the Middle and Near East. In Judea he acquired the Staff of Solomon, which he later gave to Solomon Kane to aid him in his wanderings. N'Longa's magical powers derive from his ability to send his spirit out of his body. He can take over the bodies of the living and dead through this method, to communicate with Solomon Kane through the Staff of Solomon, and also summons the vultures by sending his spirit to parley with them.

Le Loup
A French criminal mastermind (his name means "the wolf") whom Kane spent several years tracking down to avenge the murder of a dying girl he found, and her whole village. Kane eventually tracks le Loup to Africa, where he first meets N'Longa, and justice is served.

The Fishhawk
His real name is Jonas Hardraker and he is known on all coasts of the civilized world as a ruthless pirate. He is a tall, rangy, broad-shouldered man, with a lean hawk-like cruel face. Solomon Kane hunted him for two years after Hardraker sank a ship that was carrying the daughter of an old friend of Kane, the old friend having gone mad after hearing of his daughter's death. Kane finally confronted and killed Hardraker in England where Hardraker was smuggling alcohol with Sir George Banway.

Works 

Most of the Solomon Kane stories were first published in Weird Tales. Some stories were first published in a collection, also entitled Red Shadows, released posthumously. The order of publication, however, does not coincide with the order in which the stories were written.

Adaptations

Audio
There are currently three audio-book recordings of Solomon Kane stories and poems, all currently available for purchase and download through Audible. There is one free audio drama production:
 The Savage Tales of Solomon Kane, an unabridged audio-book of the collected Solomon Kane stories released by Tantor Audio and narrated by Paul Boehmer, originally available on CD.
 A 2019 unabridged recording in French released by Hardigan Audio and read by Nicolas Planchais.
 A 2013 recording of the poem "Solomon Kane's Homecoming", released by Spoken Realms Audio and read by Glenn Hascall.

Film

At the 2006 San Diego Comic Con, it was announced that Solomon Kane, a feature film based upon the eponymous character, was in development at Davis-Films, with M. J. Bassett writing and directing. The film was produced by Samuel Hadida, Paul Berrow and Kevan Van Thompson. Shooting started in Czech Republic in January 2008, with James Purefoy (Rome'''s Mark Anthony) as Kane. Max von Sydow plays Kane's father, and Pete Postlethwaite, Alice Krige and Jason Flemyng are among the supporting cast. Patrick Tatopoulos, creature designer for Godzilla, Underworld, Silent Hill, I Am Legend and others, conceptualized the monsters Kane fights in his battles with the forces of evil. The film was released in France on December 23, 2009, in the UK on February 19, 2010 and in the US on September 28th, 2012

Comics

Marvel Comics published several comic books featuring Solomon Kane in the 1970s and 1980s.
It was announced at the 2006 Comic Con that Paradox Entertainment has completed a publishing deal with Dark Horse Comics for a Solomon Kane comic series, to be written by Scott Allie, drawn by Mario Guevara, and colored by Dave Stewart.  As of 2012, three mini-series were published: Solomon Kane, Solomon Kane: Death's Black Riders, and Solomon Kane: Red Shadows.Andrew Cain, a fictional 19th century monster hunter in the Italian comic book Zagor was inspired by Kane.<ref>Zagor - Il terrore dal mare/The sea terror </ref>
Chronologically, Andrew Cain appears:
in editions of Zagor published by Slobodna Dalmacija : 50 Morska strava, 51, Witch hunter, 52 Kraken.
in editions of Zagor published by Ludens : 103 Cain's Return, 104 Atlantis, 105 The Hidden Fortress.

Role-playing game
Pinnacle Entertainment Group has published a role-playing game based on the character utilizing the Savage Worlds rules system, titled The Savage World of Solomon Kane. In addition to game rules, the book features a background and summaries of Howard's original stories and an original adventure campaign featuring a group of wanderers following the path of Kane and revisiting places changed by Solomon's actions. Pinnacle Entertainment Group also published several companion campaign books that expand on the Solomon Kane universe.  The total roster of books include:
The Savage World of Solomon Kane (Savage Worlds, S2P10400) October 29, 2007. 
Travelers' Tales (Solomon Kane Adventure, S2P10401) August 18, 2008.
The Savage Foes of Solomon Kane (Savage Worlds, S2P10402) May 17, 2010.
The Path of Kane (Solomon Kane, Savage Worlds, S2P10403) November 14, 2011.  (Out of Print -- Limited Availability) 

Board game
Mythic Games has developed a narrative adventure board game simply titled Solomon Kane based on Robert E. Howard's original stories and characters. The game was funded via the crowdfunding platform Kickstarter in July 2018 and has been in development since, with initial release slated for summer 2020.

The game is a co-op style board game where players represent the virtues that drive Solomon Kane forwards in his quest against darkness. Kane's various adventures are told in the game through one or more acts, which break down into smaller chapters of gameplay. These are scenarios with multiple possible outcomes and branching story arcs, where the players also have a chance of diverging from the original stories of Robert E. Howard and instead explore a number of "what if" scenarios written by Mythic Games.

Sculptures, toys, and miniatures
Fernando Ruiz Miniatures (FerMiniatures) sells a sculpted miniature of Solomon Kane that can be painted and displayed or used in a role-playing game. This miniature presents Kane in puritan attire, equipped with a rapier sword, a dagger, pistols and the mythical Staff of Solomon, given to him by the shaman N’Longa.

Mezco Toyz has created a Solomon Kane action figure for its One:12 Collective product line.  This 17cm action figure is outfitted in a nobleman’s shirt and vest, duster coat, adventurer pants, and Viking boots. His utility belt and removable chest harness can hold his various weapon sheaths. It also features interchangeable hair, interchangeable facial expressions,  the Staff of Solomon, multiple daggers and sheaths, a flintlock pistol, and a dirk sword.

The Figures Toy Company created a toy action figure for Solomon Kane in 2014. This 8 inch figure includes a hat, sword and flintlock pistol.

Randy Bowen Designs created a cold cast bronze sculpture of Solomon Kane in 1998. It is based on the image from Robert E. Howard's "The Savage Tales of Solomon Kane". The statue 1/9th scale is fully painted. 
The sculpture comes with interchangeable hands, either holding a sword or the Staff of Solomon stick. It comes on a black display base and is numbered from a limited edition run of 550.

Copyright and trademark
Trademark on the name Solomon Kane and the names of Robert E. Howard's other principal characters are claimed by Paradox Entertainment of Stockholm, Sweden, through its US subsidiary Paradox Entertainment Inc. Paradox also claims copyrights on the stories written by other authors under license from Solomon Kane Inc. Since Robert E. Howard published his Solomon Kane stories at a time when the date of publication was the marker, the owners had to use the copyright symbol, and they had to renew after a certain time to maintain copyright, the exact status of all of Howard's Solomon Kane works are in question.

Project Gutenberg, for example, holds only some of Robert E. Howard's stories (none of which include Solomon Kane) while Project Gutenberg Australia has a more complete selection, implying that the stories are unambiguously free from copyright under Australian law, while the possibility of copyright renewal disbars many from Project Gutenberg's inclusion criteria in the United States.

Subsequent stories written by other authors are subject to the copyright laws of the relevant time.

Solomon Kane stories by other authors

Tales of the Shadowmen

Tales of the Shadowmen is an anthology series edited by Jean-Marc Lofficier and Randy Lofficier, where characters from French and international speculative fiction exist in the same universe. Tales of the Shadowmen, Volume 3: Danse Macabre includes a story entitled "The Heart of the Moon" by Matthew Baugh which features Solomon Kane as one of a group of adventurers visiting Féval's vampire metropolis, Selene. Tales of the Shadowmen, Volume 4: Lords of Terror includes a story entitled "The Anti-Pope of Avignon" by Micah Harris featuring Solomon Kane as the central protagonist supporting the Huguenot cause in Avignon.

The Wold Newton Family

In Philip José Farmer's Doc Savage: His Apocalyptic Life, Farmer identifies Solomon Kane as being a direct ancestor of adventurer Doc Savage. This book is part of a larger literary conceit that the (real) meteorite which fell in Wold Newton, Yorkshire, England, on December 13, 1795 was radioactive and caused genetic mutations in the occupants of a passing coach. As luck would have it many of these occupants were also already of heroic stock. See the Savage Family Tree.

Observable Things
Paul Di Filippo's "Observable Things", as narrated by a young Cotton Mather, tells of Solomon Kane coming to the aid of the colonists in New England during King Philip's War.

Book editions
Howard's stories, poems, and fragments featuring Solomon Kane have been published several times as a collection in book form. Not every publication has been a complete collection.

 Red Shadows, Donald M. Grant, 1968 (all but Death's Black Riders, assembled by the Howard estate's literary agent, Glenn Lord, in what he considered internal chronological order.
 Rattle of Bones & Other Terrifying Tales, Clover Press, LLC, October 2020.
 The Solomon Kane Omnibus, Benediction Classics, Oxford, 2010.
 Three-volume set, all but Death's Black Riders:
 The Moon of Skulls, Centaur Press, November 1969.
 The Hand of Kane, Centaur Press, October 1970.
 Solomon Kane, Centaur Press, February 1971.
 Two-volume set, all but Death's Black Riders, with introductory essays by Ramsey Campbell, who also completed the three sizable fragments for this collection:
 Solomon Kane: Skulls in the Stars, Bantam Books, December 1978.
 Solomon Kane: The Hills of the Dead, Bantam Books, March 1979.
 Solomon Kane, Baen Books, November 1995. (This edition contains the same texts & Ramsey Campbell material as the Bantam set.)
 The Savage Tales of Solomon Kane, Wandering Star, November 1998. (British edition)
  The Savage Tales of Solomon Kane (2004) Howard, Robert E.; Illus. Gianni, Gary.  New York: Ballantine Books. . (North American edition)
 The Right Hand of Doom & Other Tales of Solomon Kane, Wordsworth Editions, 2007.
 Las Aventuras de Solomón Kane, Ultima Thule, Ed. Anaya, Spain, November 1994. (A complete collection of stories, poems, and fragments featuring Solomon Kane, in Spanish translation.)
 Ten (?) volume set from Wildside Press, the publisher of Weird Tales, as a complete collection of Howard's entire Weird Tales catalog.
 Shadow Kingdoms: The Weird Works of Robert E. Howard Volume One, Wildside Press, 2004.
 Moon of Skulls: The Weird Works of Robert E. Howard Volume Two, Wildside Press, 2006.
 People of the Dark: The Weird Works of Robert E. Howard Volume Three, 2006.()
 Wings in the Night: The Weird Works of Robert E. Howard Volume Four, 2006.
 Valley of the Worm: The Weird Works of Robert E. Howard Volume Five, 2006.
 The Garden of Fear: The Weird Works of Robert E. Howard Volume Six, 2006.
 Beyond the Black River: The Weird Works of Robert E. Howard Volume Seven, 2007.
 Hours of the Dragon: The Weird Works of Robert E. Howard Volume Eight, 2008.
 Black Hounds of Death: The Weird Works Of Robert E. Howard Volume Nine, 2008.
 A Thunder of Trumpets: The Weird Works of Robert E. Howard, Volume Ten, 2010.

References

External links

The Solomon Kane Chronology
Poetry Reading: The Savage Tales of Solomon Kane
 
 
 

Characters in pulp fiction
Literary characters introduced in 1928
Fictional Christians
Fictional English people
Fictional swordfighters
Fictional vampire hunters
Robert E. Howard characters
Superheroes
Fictional people from the 16th-century
Fictional people from the 17th-century